There are a number of special routes of U.S. Route 85. These special routes connect U.S. Route 85 to downtown areas, bypass city centers or provide alternate routes around an area.

Current routes

Fort Lupton, Colorado

U.S. Route 85 Business in Fort Lupton, Colorado is a business spur that follows SH 52 east from US 85 to Denver Avenue, then turns north onto Denver Ave. and ends at Weld County Road 16 north of town.

Major intersections

Platteville, Colorado

U.S. Route 85 Business in Platteville, Colorado is a business spur that goes from the intersection with Weld County Road 28 south of town to US 85 in north Platteville.

Major intersections

Greeley, Colorado

U.S. Route 85 Business in Greeley, Colorado is a business route that begins at the Garden City Connector in Evans, Colorado, and runs north into Greeley. At 23rd Street, it joins 8th Avenue and heads north until it terminates at US 85 at the northeast edge of the city.

Major intersections

Lead–Deadwood, South Dakota

U.S. Route 85 Truck (US 85 Truck) is a truck route that travels from the downtowns of Lead and Deadwood, South Dakota, and is entirely concurrent with US 14 Alternate (US 14 Alt.).

Watford City, North Dakota

U.S. Route 85 Business in Watford City, North Dakota is a route that goes into the downtown area of Watford City.

Alexander, North Dakota

U.S. Route 85 Business in Alexander, North Dakota is a route that goes into the downtown area of Alexander.

Major intersections

Williams County, North Dakota

Former routes

El Paso business loop

Anthony–Las Cruces alternate route

Santa Fe bypass route

Barelas–Alameda alternate route

Fountain–Colorado Springs bypass route

Williston business route

U.S. Route 85 Business (US 85) is a business route of US 85 in Williston, North Dakota. It went into the downtown area of Williston. This route is now US 2 Bus.

References

85
 
U.S. Highways in North Dakota
U.S. Highways in Colorado